The 2014 CONSUR Cup was the inaugural year of the top division of Confederación Sudamericana de Rugby. Argentina are automatic seeds into the competition, with the top two teams from the 2013 South American Rugby Championship "A"; Chile and Uruguay playing alongside Los Pumas.

Standings

Pre-tournament rankings are in parentheses. Chile' and Uruguay' rankings will be as of 12 May 2014.

Matches
The dates and venues were announced on 23 April.

Round 1

Round 2

Round 3

See also
 2014 South American Rugby Championship "A"

References

2014
2014 rugby union tournaments for national teams
    
2014 in Argentine rugby union
rugby union
rugby union
International rugby union competitions hosted by Uruguay
International rugby union competitions hosted by Chile